Wheeling is an unincorporated community in Washington Township, Gibson County, Indiana, United States. The community contains a historic covered bridge over the Patoka River, the Wheeling Bridge, completed in 1877.

History
Wheeling was originally named Kirksville, and under the latter name was platted in 1856. It was once a thriving agricultural community on the banks of the Patoka River until the railroad bypassed the community and it lost business to nearby towns.

The village of Wheeling was platted July 4, 1856. It was first called Kirksville, sometimes spelled Kirkville. It may have been named for Robert Kirk, an early judge. Locally it was also called Bovine. A Post Office called Bovine was established on April 4, 1854, but closed July 14, 1902.

References

Unincorporated communities in Gibson County, Indiana
Unincorporated communities in Indiana